William Durkin may refer to:
*William Durkin (basketball) (1922–2012), American professional basketball player
William Durkin (footballer) (1921–2000), English professional footballer
William L. Durkin (1916–2006), American soldier